"Do What I Gotta Do" is a song performed by American contemporary R&B singer Ralph Tresvant, issued as the third single from his eponymous debut album. The song peaked at No. 2 on the Billboard R&B singles chart in 1991. Although it failed to reach the Billboard Hot 100 chart, it entered the Hot 100 Singles Sales chart, peaking at No. 54 in August 1991.

Music video

The official music video for the song was directed by Stefan Würnitzer.

Chart positions

References

External links
 
 

1990 songs
1991 singles
MCA Records singles
Ralph Tresvant songs
Contemporary R&B ballads
Song recordings produced by Jimmy Jam and Terry Lewis
Songs written by Jimmy Jam and Terry Lewis